Rear Admiral James James Miles Parkin,  is a senior Royal Navy officer.

Naval career
Educated at the University of Oxford and the Britannia Royal Naval College, Parkin joined the Royal Navy in 1999. After commanding the patrol vessel, HMS Ranger, he became commanding officer of the frigate HMS Montrose in 2012 and of the assault ship, HMS Bulwark in 2016. He went on to become Commander Littoral Strike Group in May 2018 and, concurrently, commander of the International Maritime Security Construct in January 2020. After that he became Assistant Chief of Staff for Joint Plans at Permanent Joint Headquarters in April 2020 and Assistant Chief of the Naval Staff (Capability) as well as Controller of the Navy in September 2021.

He was appointed a Commander of the Order of the British Empire (CBE) in the 2020 Birthday Honours.

References

Royal Navy rear admirals
Commanders of the Order of the British Empire
Year of birth missing (living people)
Living people